Platoecobius is a genus of spiders in the family Oecobiidae. It was first described in 1935 by Chamberlin & Ivie. , it contains 2 species.

References

External links
 iNaturalist

Oecobiidae
Araneomorphae genera
Spiders of the United States
Spiders of Argentina